Davide Uccellari (born 11 October 1991) is an Italian triathlete.

At the 2012 Summer Olympics men's triathlon on Tuesday, August 7, he placed 29th.

References 

1991 births
Living people
Italian male triathletes
Triathletes at the 2012 Summer Olympics
Triathletes at the 2016 Summer Olympics
Triathletes of Fiamme Azzurre
Olympic triathletes of Italy
20th-century Italian people
21st-century Italian people